A village head, village headman or village chief is the community leader of a village or a small town.

Usage

Brunei 

It is an administrative post which leads the community of a village administrative division, the third and lowest subdivision of the country.

Malaysia 

Generally in Malaysia, the village head is called , except for the proto Malay village where the position is called . In Sarawak, the head of a traditional long house is called .

Indonesia
The village head in Indonesia is called .

China 
In China, village head is a local government or tribal post. The village headman is the person appointed to administer an area that is often a single village.

Duties and functions 
The headman has several official duties in the village, and is sometimes seen as a mediator in disputes and a general “fixer” of village or individuals problems.

Examples of headmanship have been observed among the Zuni, !Kung, and Mehinacu, among others. Nearby tribal leaders recognized or appointed by the Chinese were known as tusi (tu-szu), although they could command larger areas than a single village.

Historical usage

Japan 
In Edo period Japan, the village head was called nanushi (名主) and was in charge of tax collection, general village administration, management of public natural resources (such as mountain, field, river and ocean) of the village, as well as negotiating with the territorial lord as the representative of the villagers.

See also 
 Barangay Captain, head of a barangay or village in the Philippines
 Dibao (ti-pao) or "headman", a Qing-era village official
 Opperhoofd
 Onyishi
 Starosta - term used in Central and Eastern Europe
 Tribal chief

References 

Political occupations
Titles of national or ethnic leadership